Acanthogobius is a genus of gobies native to marine, fresh and brackish waters of eastern Asia.

Species
There are currently six recognized species in this genus:
 Acanthogobius elongatus (Fang, 1942) 
 Acanthogobius flavimanus (Temminck & Schlegel, 1845) (Yellowfin goby)
 Acanthogobius hasta (Temminck & Schlegel, 1845)
 Acanthogobius insularis Shibukawa & Taki, 1996 
 Acanthogobius lactipes (Hilgendorf, 1879)
 Acanthogobius luridus Y. Ni & H. L. Wu, 1985

Summary 
Body relatively large, head moderately long, triangular in cross-section, eyes close together near top of head; mouth terminal, oblique, reaching almost to below middle of eye.

A brownish goby with darker mottling on the back and cheek, and a thin dark diagonal line from eye to rear margin of jaws. Midsides with 6-8 irregular darker blotches, and a dark round spot at the base of the tail. Upper part of pectoral-fin base with a short horizontal dark bar. Dorsal and caudal fin with fine speckled lines, pectoral  fins yellow.

Accidentally introduced to Australia and California when juveniles or larvae were transported in ship's ballast water which was released in ports of call.

References 

Gobionellinae
Taxa named by Theodore Gill